Sundell may refer to:

Places 
 Sundell, Michigan, an unincorporated community in Rock River Township, Michigan

People with the surname 
 Harri Sundell, Finnish decathlete, winner of the Finnish national championship in 1984
 Leif Sundell, Swedish soccer referee
 Ola Sundell, Swedish politician
 Per Håkan Sundell, Swedish programmer